José Francisco Bermúdez (23 January 1782, Cariaco – 15 December 1831, Cumaná) was a Venezuelan revolutionary and military officer. A major lieutenant of Simón Bolívar, he fought in the Venezuelan War of Independence, reaching the rank of General. He is buried in the National Pantheon of Venezuela.

A municipality (Bermúdez Municipality) and an airport (General José Francisco Bermúdez Airport), both in his native Sucre State, are named in his honour.

References

1782 births
1831 deaths
People of the Venezuelan War of Independence
Venezuelan revolutionaries
Burials at the National Pantheon of Venezuela